Horrid Henry Tricks The Tooth Fairy is the third book of the Horrid Henry series. It was published in 1996 as Horrid Henry and the Tooth Fairy and was written by Francesca Simon and illustrated by Tony Ross.

Plot

Horrid Henry Tricks The Tooth Fairy
Everyone in Horrid Henry's class had lost at least one tooth - that is except Henry himself. Just today, his younger brother, Perfect Peter had lost a tooth. So, Henry decides to eat as many sweets as he can from his sweet jar, although it is two days before "Sweet Day" when he is allowed to eat sweets. Henry's "hard work" comes to a waste when none of his teeth feel wobbly and worse, his mouth, gums and stomach hurt. Then, he gets a "brilliant" idea. He decides to trick the tooth fairy. So on that night, Henry silently creeps into Peter's room and steals the tooth Peter placed under his pillow but bumps into his mother and manages to escape. The next morning, Henry doesn't find a coin from the tooth fairy but Peter finds a pound coin from the fairy. Henry asks his mother how the tooth fairy knows whose pillow to put money and she says that she looks at the gap between the child's teeth. Henry realizes his mistake and places a piece of black paper over his mouth. At night, when he sleeps, he ties his finger to a fake vampire tooth (a substitute for the real one) to make sure that when the tooth fairy comes and takes his tooth, he gets woken up. The next morning, Henry receives a fake 50p coin and a letter from the tooth fairy, mocking him for his trick. Henry's mother calls him down and scolds him for eating all the sweets and tells him to eat apples instead. Henry takes an apple and bites on it. To his horror, the bite had made him lose a tooth and he had swallowed it!

Horrid Henry's Wedding
Horrid Henry's cousin, Prissy Polly, is marrying Pimply Paul. Henry has been chosen to be a pageboy, along with Perfect Peter, his brother. First, Henry's family has trouble with Henry's pageboy clothes as they are too "tight". Second, they have trouble with Henry going to the wedding and they drag him into the car to go. Worse still, they are caught in the middle of a thunderstorm. They arrive at the wedding later than everybody. While the priest says all the holy blessings and promises, Henry pretends he is a famous chef who is tossing pancakes, only that he is tossing the wedding rings. When the rings (which Henry lost) are needed, Henry gives them a toy pirate ring. Afterwards, when everyone takes photos, Henry jumps in at the last moment and makes horrible faces. A while later, during the reception, while everyone is eating their lunch, Henry secretly eats the wedding cake but Pimply Paul catches him. While Paul is chasing Henry, he leaps and lands into the cake. Henry's entire family thinks it's weird that there is no wedding cake...except for Henry!

Moody Margaret Moves In
Moody Margaret is going to move into Henry's house for two weeks. His room is also given to Margaret and he has to sleep in Perfect Peter's room. When Margaret arrives, she immediately orders everyone to do spring cleaning. After that, everyone has dinner and Margaret consistently gets Henry into trouble. At bedtime, Margaret booby traps Henry's bed and stresses his parents by complaining. In the morning, Margaret blasts everyone out of bed with the noise from her trumpet, screams at the top of her voice to Mum and forces her to make breakfast for her. She found Henry's secret biscuits and crisps and ate every single one. On Wednesday, Margaret bans everyone from playing tapes because it disturbs her. One Thursday, Margaret stops Henry from singing as it disturbs her. On Friday, she makes Henry stop breathing for a while as it disturbs her. Henry gets fed up and devises a plan to get rid of her. He calls Margaret's parents to come at once from their holiday as Margaret is in an emergency. His plan works and Margaret's gone but Peter tells Mum and Dad what Henry did. Henry prepares for his punishment when Mum just simply says to him, "Go to your room." and Henry thinks that sweeter words were never spoken due to being kept from his room for 6 days.

Horrid Henry's New Teacher
Horrid Henry is a teacher's worst nightmare, but not for Ninius Nerdon. When he is Henry's teacher, he demonstrates his resilience perfectly. He can backfire Henry's tricks on him and answer back to a stupid statement that Henry gives. He never demonstrates irateness towards Henry and can even twist Henry's rude jokes into a nightmare for Henry. But when Henry makes him believe that Peter is dead, Mr. Nerdon faints and gets taken away by the emergency services. Henry however isn’t bothered about the fact that the even more notorious teacher (towards students) Miss Battle-Axe will be teach his class from then on.

Publication
 The book was first published in Hardback in 1996.
 It was published in Paperback in 1997.
 The current edition was published in 2000.
 "Horrid Henry's New Teacher" has been reprinted in "Horrid Henry's Big Bad Book".
 "Horrid Henry Tricks the Tooth Fairy" has been reprinted in "Horrid Henry's Wicked Ways.
 "Moody Margaret Moves In" has been reprinted in "Horrid Henry's Evil Enemies'.
 "Horrid Henry's Wedding has been reprinted in "Horrid Henry's Dreadful Deeds".
 The entire book, along with every other Horrid Henry book has been reprinted in "Horrid Henry's A-Z of Everything Horrid".
 The entire book has been reprinted in Paperback with an audio CD with it, still of the same title

In other media
 All the stories have been adapted into animated episodes in the Horrid Henry TV series.

References

External links
 Horrid Henry Tricks the Tooth Fairy at the Horrid Henry Official Website

Horrid Henry
1996 children's books
1996 short story collections
British children's books
Children's short story collections